This is a list of people who have served as governor of Tennessee.

The governor's term in office is limited by the Tennessee state constitution. The first constitution, enacted in 1796, set a term of two years for the governor and provided that no person could serve as governor for more than 6 years in any 8-year period. The term of office was lengthened to four years, without the possibility of consecutive terms, by constitutional amendments adopted in 1953. Under the current provisions of the state constitution, as amended in 1978, the governor is elected to a four-year term and may serve no more than two terms consecutively. For a period of nearly five decades in the 20th century, the Tennessee Democratic Party held the Tennessee governorship continuously.

Tennessee has had 50 governors, including the incumbent, Bill Lee. Seven governors (John Sevier, William Carroll, Andrew Johnson, Robert Love Taylor, Gordon Browning, Frank G. Clement, and Buford Ellington) have served non-consecutive terms. This tally does not include William Blount (the territorial governor) or Robert L. Caruthers (who never took office), though the Blue Book includes them in its list of governors.  All governors are counted only once, regardless of number of terms served (e.g., John Sevier is considered the 1st governor, rather than the 1st and 3rd governor).  The Blue Book does not include Edward H. East in its list of governors.

Southwest Territory
The Territory South of the River Ohio, commonly called the Southwest Territory, was formed in 1790 from lands ceded by North Carolina to the United States government. The territory was admitted to the Union as the State of Tennessee in 1796.

 Parties

State of Tennessee

 Parties 
 (6)
 (31)
 (4)
 (1)
 (10)

References
Specific

General

 Vile, John R., and  Byrnes, Mark E. Tennessee Government and Politics: Democracy in the Volunteer State. 1998, Vanderbilt University Press. p. 43

External links
Tennessee Blue Book: Historical Listings of Constitutional Officers
Tennessee Blue Book: Past Governors of Tennessee

Lists of state governors of the United States

Governors
governor